The Friend of the Society Award pays tribute to individuals or organizations who have provided an exceptional and notable contribution to the operation and the objectives of the Society of Experimental Test Pilots (SETP). The award was established in 1995 and is sponsored by SETP. A Friend of the Society is not a member of SETP, and there is no requirement for a Friend of the Society to be awarded every year. Honorees are announced at the annual Awards Banquet in Los Angeles, California where they receive public recognition and a commemorative plaque.

Criteria 
A Friend of the Society must meet the following criteria:
Candidates may not be members of the Society and it is preferred that candidates not be eligible for membership in the Society.
The candidate must, over a significant time period, have made a significant contribution to the operation support and the objectives of the Society.

Recipients 
Recipients of this award, from 1995 to present, include:

1995—Barron Hilton, Hilton Hotels Corporation
1996—Dr. Gerry Morton, Robert Staubli
1998—David Hartman, Rodman-Downs Ltd.
1999—Chaplain William Willson, CHCUSN (Ret)
2000—Dr. Richard P. Hallion, USAF Historian and Dr. James O. Young, AFFTC Chief Historian
2001—Bob Lafey, Boeing, Audio Visual and Claude Pasquis, CLP Enterprises, Audio Visual
2002—Dan Sabovich
2003—Fred Johnsen
2004—Trevor Bushell, BAE Systems and John Hodgeson
2005—Tom Roberts
2006—Michael A. Dornheim and Ken Szalai
2007—Dana Kilanowski
2009—Hank Caruso, ForeFeathers Enterprises
2010—Michael J. Fahrney, The Boeing Company
2011—Richard R. Schock, FMS Financial Partners
2012—Paula S. Smith, Executive Director, SETP
2013—Katherine Benjamin
2014—Steve Lewis, National Test Pilot School
2015—Carol Guthrie, Former AFFTC Deputy Comptroller and Author
2016—Dennis Archuleta, Northrop Grumman and Louise Cullina, Airline Pilots Association (ALPA)
2017—Heidi Biermeier
2018—Jan and Bruce Schell
2019 - Natalie Rice, Disneyland Resorts
2020 - Not Awarded
2021 - Not Awarded
2022 - Not Awarded

See also

 List of aviation awards

References

Aviation awards